Marianne Elizabeth Lane Hickey, also known as Lisa Lane (born April 25, 1938, in Philadelphia), is an American former chess player. She was the U.S. Women's Chess Champion in 1959, but not a chess master. She appeared on the cover of Sports Illustrated in the August 7, 1961 edition, making her the first chess player to appear on its cover (Bobby Fischer did so in 1972).

Early life and chess career
Born in Philadelphia, Lane never knew her father, a leather glazer. As a child, she and her sister Evelyn lived with their grandmother and various neighbors while their mother held down two jobs. In 1957, while attending Temple University, Lisa struck and killed an elderly woman while driving her mother's car (Lane was not charged); this, and the end of a love affair, set Lane into a depression.

Rather than beginning to play chess as a child, Lane discovered chess in her late teens. After investing her remaining savings in a Philadelphia bookstore, Lane began playing chess at local coffeehouses and "winning all the time", she said. After coaching by master Attilio Di Camillo, Lane won the women's championship of Philadelphia in 1958 and took her first U.S. Women's Chess Championship in 1959 at the age of 21, just two years after she began playing the game. She held this title until 1962, losing it to Gisela Kahn Gresser. Lane had an Elo rating of 2002, a low expert rating, from the United States Chess Federation as of the end of 1961. In 1963, Lane opened her own chess club, The Queen's Pawn Chess Emporium in New York City. In 1966, she shared the U.S. Women's Chess Champion title with Gresser. She competed in the Women's World Championship Tournament twice, in 1962 (joint 12th of 17) and 1965 (12th of 18).

Lane has been married twice – first to Walter Rich, a Philadelphia ad man and commercial artist, from 1959 to 1961; then to Neil Hickey, editor-at-large of the Columbia Journalism Review, since 1962. Both Lisa and her husband were friends of Bobby Fischer and assisted Fischer in some chess articles. (Despite her friendship with him, Fischer was not impressed with Lane's, or any woman's, chess playing abilities: "They're all fish. Lisa, you might say, is the best of the American fish.")

Later life
According to two-time U.S. Women's Chess Champion Jennifer Shahade (author of Chess Bitch, a book about women chess players), Lisa quit the game partly because she was annoyed with being identified as a chess player. "It got to be embarrassing, constantly being introduced as a chess champion at parties."

In a 2018 interview with Sports Illustrated writer Emma Baccellieri, Lane said, "I felt it would be letting the idea of women’s chess down if I said no [to a man challenging her]", Lane says. "I felt like I was working all the time.... The idea that I was defending my title every time I sat down to play was an unpleasant feeling, even though I wasn’t really defending it. I just couldn’t put the title of women's chess champion on the line every time I sat down to play."

On her fame, Hickey said to Shahade, "I guess I was good copy. I don't think the things I did in chess forty years ago are the most important things in my life."

In the 1970s, Lane and her husband opened a gift shop called Amber Waves of Grain (now called Earth Lore), in Pawling, New York.

Television appearances
Lane appeared as a contestant on the March 31, 1960, episode of the TV show To Tell the Truth. The four panel members (Polly Bergen, Don Ameche, Kitty Carlisle, and Tom Poston) correctly guessed her identity. She also appeared as a contestant on the May 21, 1961, episode of the TV show What's My Line? and stumped the panel (Dorothy Kilgallen, Arlene Francis, Bennett Cerf, and Abe Burrows).

References

External links
 
 
  – an unofficial page containing many articles
 Lisa Lane – The first chess beauty queen ChessBase.com

1938 births
Living people
American female chess players
Sportspeople from Philadelphia
21st-century American women